Gabriel Manigault (April 21, 1704 – June 5, 1781) was an American merchant.

Manigault was born in Charleston, South Carolina, 21 April 1704; died there, 5 June 1781. He engaged successfully in commercial pursuits in Charleston, accumulating a fortune of about $800,000. He invested his profits in rice plantations and slaves, eventually owning 270 of the latter. He was treasurer of the province of South Carolina in 1738, when the accounts of the St. Augustine expedition were examined, and for several years represented Charleston in the provincial house of commons. Shortly after the Declaration of Independence he advanced $220,000 from his private fortune to the state of South Carolina for purposes of defence. When General Augustine Prevost appeared before Charleston in May, 1779, he armed and equipped himself and his grandson, Joseph, a boy of fifteen, and both took their places in the lines for the defence of the city. At his death he left £5,000 sterling to the South Carolina society, of Charleston.

References
 

Colonial American merchants
1704 births
1781 deaths
Businesspeople from Charleston, South Carolina
Members of the South Carolina General Assembly
South Carolina colonial people
American slave owners
Gabriel